Redeye is a comic strip created by cartoonist Gordon Bess that was syndicated by King Features Syndicate to more than 100 newspapers. The strip debuted on September 11, 1967, and ran until July 13, 2008.

Publication history 
Bess wrote and drew the strip from 1967 until 1988, when he was forced by illness to pass it on to Bill Yates (writing) and Mel Casson (artwork). Casson took over both roles in 1999 when Bill Yates became ill. Yates died in 2001. Casson continued the strip alone from 1999 until his own death in May 2008. Casson was not replaced, and publication ended as submitted material ran out. The strip came to an end on July 13, 2008.

In recent years, a small number of newspapers have been carrying the strip on Sundays only, reprinting from the 1988-99 Yates/Casson era.

Characters and story
Redeye is a comic about a tribe of Native Americans during the 19th century, portraying the Indians in a similar way as what Hägar the Horrible did with the Vikings. It has also been compared to Tumbleweeds.
 Redeye, overweight chief of the Chickiepan tribe
 Tanglefoot, a cowardly and stupid warrior who is in love with Redeye's daughter
 Mawsquaw, a bossy, very overweight wife who is a terrible cook
 Tawnee, Redeye's beautiful daughter
 Pokey, Redeye's younger son, a practical joker
 Granny, Redeye's liquors-hungry widowed mother (sometimes known as Minnie)
 A medicine man who is only interested in playing golf and seducing the nurse
 Jerkymiah, an extremely dirty, bearded trapper
 Various talking animals, including Loco, Redeye's steed

Books
Beginning in 1968, Redeye was collected in paperbacks published by Saalfield Publishing.

Awards
Redeye was especially popular in Europe, where it appeared in Tintin magazine between 1969 and 1990 and received the 1976 Best Foreign Comical Work Award at the Angoulême International Comics Festival.

Translations
Danish: Rødøje, some albums by Carlsen Verlag
Dutch: Roodvoet het Indiaantje in the Flemish newspaper Het Laatste Nieuws in 1968, and Roodoog in Kuifje, the Dutch translation of Tintin, and in 9 albums between 1972 and 1985
Finnish: Punasulka, few albums starting from 1976
French: La tribu terrible, in Tintin magazine from 1969 until 1990
Plume d'oeuf, in Le Républicain Lorrain (newspaper) from circa 1968 until this day
German,: Feuerauge, 2 albums in 1973, and Häuptling Feuerauge, in Zack magazine between 1974 and 1980: also the subject of a radio drama in 1977
Italian: La tribù terribile, in the magazine Corriere dei Ragazzi in 1974
Norwegian: Rødøye, secondary recurring strip in Billy (Beetle Bailey magazine), from 1976
Portuguese: Olho Vermelho 1 album in 1971, and Touro Sentado, in Gibi magazine in 1974 in Brazil
Spanish: Ojo Rojo in the magazine El Cuco

References

External links
Redeye at Don Markstein's Toonopedia. Archived from the original on January 5, 2017.

1967 comics debuts
2008 comics endings
American comic strips
Gag-a-day comics
Fictional Native American people
American comics characters
Fictional tribal chiefs
Comics set in the United States
Western (genre) comics